Colonia Soto is a rural community located in Etchojoa Municipality, Sonora, Mexico. It had a population of 429 inhabitants at the 2010 census, and is situated at an elevation of 10 meters above sea level.

References

Populated places in Sonora